Jennifer Laszlo Mizrahi (born May 8, 1964, in Durham, North Carolina) is an American disability rights activist and an advocate for Israel. She was the founder of the disability advocacy nonprofit RespectAbility. She is also the co-founder and director of the Mizrahi Family Charitable Fund.

She has published more than 100 articles on disability issues such as disability and criminal justice reform, inclusion in Hollywood, philanthropy, and inclusion in faith communities.

Career 

Mizrahi writes columns for the Huffington Post, Times of Israel, and The Mighty. She has published on inclusive philanthropy in the Chronicle of Philanthropy, Non-profit Quarterly, EJewishPhilanthropy, the D5 Coalition, and NCRP.

She has co-founded multiple organizations such as The DCJCC Community Services Program, Laszlo & Associates, The Israel Project, and Laszlo Strategies.

In 2002, Mizrahi co-founded the Israel Project, a non-profit educational and outreach organization. She spent 10 years as president of the group.

In 2012, shortly after stepping down from the Israel Project, Mizrahi re-established the Washington, D.C.-based consulting firm, Laszlo Strategies, which had previously been called Laszlo & Associates, where she advised clients on issues such as medical research and education.

Mizrahi's change from working on Israeli and Jewish issues to disability issues was broadly covered in the Jewish media including in JTA, The Baltimore Jewish Times, and Tablet. On the 25th anniversary of the Americans with Disabilities Act, she was interviewed on the Diane Rehm show.

She also serves on the board of JCHAI, Limmud, and the Jewish Federation Inclusion Committee.

Disability Rights Work 
In 2013, along with Donn Weinberg and Shelley Cohen, she co-founded RespectAbility, a disabilities-focused non-profit organisation.

Mizrahi is the co-author, along with Philip Pauli, Janie Jeffers, and Eddie Ellis of Disability & Criminal Justice Reform: Keys to Success.

During the 2016 election, Mizrahi and RespectAbility were active in raising awareness of the importance of the disability. Their publication, The RespectAbility Report, covered all the presidential candidates and swing races for Senate and Governor. In 2016 PBS NewsHour interviewed Mizrahi on getting political candidates to address disability issues.

Mizrahi has come under fire from some within the disability community for what some perceive as racist commentary on the 2016 election.

RespectAbility runs the National Leadership Program to advance a diverse leadership talent pool for the disability movement. So far, more than 140 people have graduated from the program.

Mizrahi has advocated for inclusion in Hollywood as a way of reducing stigmas surrounding disability. She also promotes people with "multiple minority status", supporting diversity for people of colour with disabilities in Hollywood. She has published op-eds on employment for people with disabilities in more than 30 states, including the early caucus state of Iowa and her native state of North Carolina.

Recognition 
The Jewish Forward has named Mizrahi as one of the 50 most influential Jews in North America three times, each time for a different body of work. In 2018 they listed her as the second most influential Jew in North America. She was also profiled in a chapter of the book Jewish Sages of Today.

In 2017, she was given a major award for being a role model for women by Culver Academy. In June 2018, she was honoured by Sulam. In September 2019, she was named as one of the 50 most influential Jews in the world by The Jerusalem Post.

During the 2018 ReelAbilities Film and Art Festival in Houston, she was presented the Bettie and Bernard Farfel Jewish Family Service Award by Jewish Family Services of Houston.

Personal life 
Mizrahi is dyslexic and has attention deficit hyperactivity disorder. She is married to Victor Mizrahi, who heads the company Mizrahi Enterprises. She completed her BA at Emory University in Jewish Studies and International Studies. She was profiled in the Emory Alumni Magazine. She did her Junior Year Abroad at Hebrew University in Jerusalem. She also has completed executive training at Harvard.

References

External links 

1964 births
Living people
People from Durham, North Carolina
Jewish American community activists
Emory University alumni
Activists from North Carolina
People with dyslexia
People with attention deficit hyperactivity disorder
21st-century American Jews
American disability rights activists
American Zionists
Jewish women